Dudera Rural District is in Rudasht District of Lordegan County, Chaharmahal and Bakhtiari province, Iran. At the most recent National Census of 2016, the population of the rural district was 1,860 in 409 households. The largest of its 25 villages was Talineh-ye Dudera, with 284 people.

References 

Lordegan County

Rural Districts of Chaharmahal and Bakhtiari Province

Populated places in Chaharmahal and Bakhtiari Province

Populated places in Lordegan County

fa:دهستان دودراء